The men's freestyle 74 kilograms wrestling competition at the 2019 European Games in Minsk was held on 25 to 26 June 2019 at the Minsk Sports Palace.

Schedule 
All times are in FET (UTC+03:00)

Results 

 Legend
 F — Won by fall
 R — Retired

Main bracket

Repechage

References

External links 
 Official website
 UWW Official website
 Competition Sheet

Wrestling at the 2019 European Games